Tom Berry is an American politician who served as a member of the Montana House of Representatives from the 40th district. Elected in 2008, Berry represented the Roundup, Montana area until January 2017.

References

External links
Tom Berry for Montana

Living people
Republican Party members of the Montana House of Representatives
People from Roundup, Montana
Year of birth missing (living people)
People from Sidney, Montana